The L. Welch Pogue Award for Lifetime Achievement in Aviation was created by Aviation Week & Space Technology to be presented to an individual who is "considered a visionary and a preeminent leader of contemporary aviation."

In 2011, the International Aviation Club of Washington, D.C., and the Jones Day law firm partnered with Aviation Week to present the award. (The IAC was co-sponsor again in 2016 and 2017.)

Recipients of the L. Welch Pogue Award 
 1994 L. Welch Pogue, former Chairman, U.S. Civil Aeronautics Board and delegate to 1944 Chicago Convention.
 1995 Henri Wassenbergh, aviation scholar
 1996 Adm. Donald Engen, former Director, National Air and Space Museum
 1997 Alfred E. Kahn, former Chairman, U.S. Civil Aeronautics Board
 1998 John E. Robson, former Chairman, U.S. Civil Aeronautics Board
 1999 Norman Y. Mineta, U.S. Secretary of Transportation
 2000 Robert T. Francis II, former Vice Chairman, National Transportation Safety Board (U.S.)
 2001 John Kern, Vice President, Regulatory Compliance and Chief Safety Officer, Northwest Airlines (retired)
 2002 Delford M. Smith, Founder and Chairman, Evergreen International Aviation
 2003 Jürgen Weber, Chairman and CEO, Deutsche Lufthansa AG
 2004 Robert Crandall, Chairman and CEO, American Airlines (retired)
 2005 Herb Kelleher, Chairman and CEO, Southwest Airlines (retired)
 2006 Jeffrey N. Shane, Under Secretary of Transportation Policy, U.S. Department of Transportation
 2007 Professor Brian O'Keeffe, Australia, father of the Future Air Navigation System (FANS)
 2008 Helen Muir, Director, Cranfield Institute for Safety, Risk and Reliability
 2009 (not awarded)
 2010 (not awarded)
 2011 Giovanni Bisignani, Director General and CEO, International Air Transport Association (IATA)
2012 John Byerly, former U.S. Deputy Assistant Secretary for Transportation Affairs
2013 Andrew B. Steinberg, Partner, Jones Day

2014 Margaret ("Peggy") Gilligan, Associate Administrator for Aviation Safety, Federal Aviation Administration.

2015 Paul Mifsud, KLM airline

2016 Dave Barger, CEO, JetBlue Airways

2017 Jane Garvey, former Administrator, Federal Aviation Administration
2018 Susan McDermott, Paul Gretch, Bob Goldner, and Mary Street former DOT Career officials

See also

 List of aviation awards

References

External links
 "Aviation Week"
 "International Aviation Club of Washington, D.C."
 "Jones Day"

Aviation awards
Lifetime achievement awards